Carbestrol (developmental code names NSC-19962, ORF-2166) is a synthetic, nonsteroidal estrogen of the cyclohexenecarboxylic acid group and seco analogue of doisynolic acid that was described in the literature in 1956 and developed for the treatment of prostate cancer in the 1960s but was never marketed.

See also
 Fenestrel
 Methallenestril
 Doisynoestrol
 Bisdehydrodoisynolic acid

References

Carboxylic acids
Cyclohexenes
Synthetic estrogens
Phenol ethers